Under the Power is a 2019 Chinese television series based on the novel of the same name by Lan Seshi; starring Ren Jialun and Tan Songyun. The series premiered on Mango TV and iQiyi starting December 28, 2019.

Synopsis 
Genius constable Yuan Jinxia and ruthless secret police officer Lu Yi are at loggerheads, but are forced to work together when the government loses one hundred thousand taels of silver. They work severals cases of murder, betrayal, conspiracies, piracy and rebellion. They gradually became friends and fall in love with each other. Unfortunately, Yuan Jinxia finds out, her family was massacred by the secret police due to false incriminating evidence against her grandfather. She and Lu Yi work together to clear her family's name, but she must ultimately choose between revenge for her family's death at the hands of the secret police or love for Li Yi.

Cast

Main 
Ren Jialun as Lu Yi
Tan Songyun as Yuan Jinxia

Supporting 
Han Dong as Yan Shifan
Ye Qing as Shangguan Xi
Yao Yichen as Xie Xiao
Lu Hong as Yang Yue
Han Chengyu as Lan Daoheng
Xi Xue as Lin Mai
Wan Tong as Di Lanye
Huang Youqi as Cen Fu
Wang Hua as Luo Wenlong
Liu Wei as Lu Bing
Li Tingzhe as Qi Shu
Ding Yongdai as Jiajing Emperor
Li Chengru as Yan Song
Li Qinqin as Yuan Jinxia's mother
Guo Xiaofeng as Yang Chengwan

Original soundtrack

Production
Under the Power was filmed from September 2017 to January 2018 at Hengdian World Studios and Suzhou.

International broadcast

References 

Television series by H&R Century Pictures
Television shows based on Chinese novels
Chinese wuxia television series
2019 web series debuts
2019 Chinese television series debuts
2020 Chinese television series endings
IQIYI original programming